Marcelo Mabilia, or simply Mabilia (born October 31, 1972 in Porto Alegre), is a Brazilian football manager and former forward.

Club statistics

Honours
 Júbilo Iwata
 J1 League: 1997

 Juventude
 Copa do Brasil: 1999

References

External links

1972 births
Living people
Footballers from Porto Alegre
Brazilian footballers
J1 League players
Campeonato Brasileiro Série A players
Expatriate footballers in Japan
Brazilian football managers
Brazilian expatriate footballers
Grêmio Foot-Ball Porto Alegrense players
Sport Club Internacional players
Mogi Mirim Esporte Clube players
Fluminense FC players
Ypiranga Futebol Clube players
Criciúma Esporte Clube players
Júbilo Iwata players
Esporte Clube Juventude players
Guarani FC players
Coritiba Foot Ball Club players
Figueirense FC players
Clube Náutico Capibaribe players
Mogi Mirim Esporte Clube managers
Associação Desportiva São Caetano managers
Esporte Clube Novo Hamburgo managers
Grêmio Foot-Ball Porto Alegrense managers
Esporte Clube Internacional de Lages managers
Tombense Futebol Clube managers
Association football forwards